Stefan Herbrechter is a freelance writer, academic, researcher and translator. Until 2014, he was Reader in Cultural Theory and Director of Postgraduate Studies (Media) at Coventry University. In 2015, he was a Senior Fellow at the IKKM in Weimar. Currently, he is a research fellow at Coventry University, Leeds Trinity University and Privatdozent at Heidelberg University.

He is the author and editor of a number of volumes, articles and contributions on literature, critical and cultural theory and cultural studies. Together with Ivan Callus, University of Malta he is editor and author of Critical Posthumanisms. He is also one of the co-directors of the Critical Posthumanism Network.

Selected awards/grants
 Senior Fellow, Internationales Kolleg für Kulturtechnikforschung und Medienphilosophie (IKKM), Bauhaus-Universität Weimar (2015)
 DFG Mercator Professorship (2010-2011), English Department, Universität Heidelberg
 DAAD Visiting Professorship (2007–2009), English Department, Universität Heidelberg

Authored and Co-Authored Monographs
 Critical Posthumanisms, Leiden: Brill (2016; forthcoming).
 Posthumanism – A Critical Analysis (Bloomsbury, 2013); reviewed by John Bruni in the EBR (with riposte by SH and reply by JB).
 Posthumanismus – Eine kritische Einführung (Wissenschaftliche Buchgesellschaft, 2009).
 Lawrence Durrell, Postmodernism and the Ethics of Alterity (Postmodern Studies 26, Brill, 1999).

Peer-Reviewed Journal Articles (selection)
 "Perdre la mesure… Or, The Ecologics of Extinction", CounterText 2.1 (forthcoming in April 2016).
 "Gegen, or Translating the (En)counter", CounterText 1.2 (2015): 154–168.
 "Posthumanistische Bildung?", Jahrbuch für Pädagogik 2014 (special issue on Menschenverbesserung und Transhumanismus), Frankfurt am Main: Peter Lang, 2014: 267–81.
 "Dis/locating Posthumanism in European Literary and Critical Traditions", European Journal of English Studies 18.2 (2014), co-authored by Ivan Callus, Stefan Herbrechter and Manuela Rossini: 103–20.
 "‘Nicht dass ich fürchtete, ein Tier zu werden…’; Ökographie in Marlen Haushofers Die Wand", Figurationen 15.1 (2014): 41-55.
 "Posthumanism, Subjectivity, Autobiography", Subjectivity 6 (2012),  special guest-edited issue on "Posthumanist Subjectivities", eds Stefan Herbrechter & Ivan Callus: 327–47.
 "Posthumanist Subjectivities, or, Coming After the Subject" (with Ivan Callus),Subjectivity 6 (2012), special guest-edited issue on "Posthumanist Subjectivities", eds Stefan Herbrechter & Ivan Callus: 241–64.
 "What is a Posthumanist Reading?" (with Ivan Callus) Angelaki 13.3 (2008): 95–111.
 "Badiou, Derrida and The Matrix: Cultural Criticism between Objectless Subjects and Subjectless Objects", Polygraph 16 (2005; special issue on ‘The Philosophy of Alain Badiou’): 205–220.
 "The Latecoming of the Posthuman, Or, Why ‘We’ Do the Apocalypse Differently, ‘Now.’" Reconstruction 4:3 (2004).
 "Preface: Alterities – Politics of In(ter)vention", Parallax 33 (special issue "Derrida & Labarrière, Alterities", trans. and ed. Stefan Herbrechter) 2004: 1–16.
 "Plus d’un – Deconstruction and the Translation of Cultural Studies", Culture Machine 6 (special issue on Cultural Studies and Deconstruction) 2004.
 "What’s Wrong with Posthumanism?" (with Ivan Callus) Rhizomes 7 (special issue ‘Theory’s Others’) (Fall 2003).

Edited Essay Collections and Edited Journal Issues
 Autoimmunities (Parallax, 2017).
 Narrating Life (with Elisabeth Friis; Experimental Practices 1, Brill, 2016).
 Deconstruction – Space – Ethics (Parallax 21.1 (2015)).
 European Posthumanism (with Manuela Rossini and Ivan Callus; European Journal of English Studies 18.2 (2014)).
 Posthumanist Subjectivities (with Ivan Callus; Subjectivity 5.3 (2012)).
 Posthumanist Shakespeares (with Ivan Callus; Palgrave, 2012).
 Cy-Borges: Memories of the Posthuman in the Work of Jorge Luis Borges (with Ivan Callus, Bucknell University Press, 2009).
 The Matrix in Theory (with Myriam Diocaretz; Critical Studies 29, Brill, 2006).
 Returning (to) Communities (with Michael Higgins; Critical Studies 28, Brill, 2006).
 Metaphors of Economy (with Nicole Bracker; Critical Studies 25, Brill, 2005)
 Post-Theory, Culture Criticism (with Ivan Callus, Critical Studies 23, Brill, 2004).
 Alterities (Parallax 10.4 (2004)).
 Discipline and Practice (with Ivan Callus; Bucknell University Press, 2004).
 Cultural Studies: Interdisciplinarity and Translation (Critical Studies'' 20, Brill, 2002).

References

External links
Stefan Herbrechter's personal homepage

Year of birth missing (living people)
Living people
British literary critics
People associated with Leeds Trinity University
Posthumanists